Walter Vernon "Vern" Hatton (born January 13, 1936) is an American basketball player who won a national championship as a player at the University of Kentucky and played professionally in the National Basketball Association.

Kentucky career
Hatton played under Kentucky coach Adolph Rupp. He is considered a Kentucky basketball legend largely due to a memorable half-court shot he made to force a third overtime in a victory over Temple University. He was voted an honorable mention All-American his senior year and scored 30 points to lead the Kentucky Wildcats over Elgin Baylor-led Seattle in winning the 1958 NCAA men's basketball championship. Hatton was named a member of the NCAA All-Tournament team for 1958 along with Baylor, Johnny Cox, and Guy Rodgers. Hatton said of playing for Rupp, "It takes you six to eight years to get over playing for Adolph Rupp, but once you get over it, you get to like him."

Professional career

He was drafted 9th overall in the 1958 NBA draft by the Cincinnati Royals. He played four years in the NBA, mainly for the Philadelphia Warriors.

Personal life
Hatton is married with three sons and is a member of the Church of Jesus Christ of Latter-day Saints.

References

Additional reading
Clark, Ryan, Game of my Life: Kentucky – Memorable Stories of Wildcats Basketball Sports Publishing LLC, Champaign IL, 2007.

External links
 Basketball Reference Vern Hatton
 BigBlueHistory.net Vernon Hatton

1936 births
Living people
American men's basketball players
Basketball players from Lexington, Kentucky
Chicago Packers players
Cincinnati Royals draft picks
Cincinnati Royals players
Guards (basketball)
Kentucky Wildcats men's basketball players
People from Owingsville, Kentucky
Philadelphia Warriors players
St. Louis Hawks players